The Grass Roots are an American rock band that charted frequently between 1965 and 1975. The band was originally the creation of Lou Adler and songwriting duo P. F. Sloan and Steve Barri. In their career, they achieved two gold albums and two gold singles, and charted singles on the Billboard Hot 100 a total of 21 times. Among their charting singles, they achieved Top 10 three times, Top 20 six times, and Top 40 14 times. They have sold over 20 million records worldwide.

Until his death in 2011, early member Rob Grill and a newer lineup of the Grass Roots continued to play many live performances each year. By 2012, the group featured no original band members, with a lineup personally chosen by Grill carrying on the legacy of the group with nationwide live performances.

The founding years
The name "Grass Roots" (originally spelled as one word "Grassroots") originated in mid-1965 as the name of a band project by Los Angeles songwriter and producer duo P.F. Sloan and Steve Barri. Sloan and Barri had written several songs in an attempt by their record company, Dunhill Records (owned by Lou Adler), to cash in on the budding folk rock movement. One of these songs was "Where Were You When I Needed You", which was recorded by Sloan and Barri. Sloan provided the lead vocals and played guitar, Larry Knechtel played keyboards, Joe Osborn played the bass, and Bones Howe was on drums. The song was released under "The Grass Roots" name and sent, as a demo, to several radio stations of the San Francisco Bay area.

When moderate interest in this new band arose, Sloan and Barri went to look for a group that could incorporate the Grass Roots name. They found one in The Bedouins, a San Francisco band that won a Battle of the Bands at a Teenage Fair in San Mateo, California. A new version of "Where Were You When I Needed You" with that band's lead vocalist, Willie Fulton (later, an early member of Tower of Power) was recorded.

In late 1965, the Grass Roots got their first official airplay on Southern California radio stations, such as KGB (AM) in San Diego and KHJ in Los Angeles, with a version of the Bob Dylan song "Mr. Jones (Ballad of a Thin Man)". Dylan granted Sloan the opportunity to cover the song after Sloan showed appreciation for his first listen to Dylan's demonstration acetate of the song.

For some months, the group appeared as the first "real" Grass Roots. They were used by Dunhill to back up The Mamas & the Papas and Barry McGuire, and became a house band at The Trip nightclub in Hollywood. The partnership with Sloan and Barri broke up when the band demanded more space for their own more blues rock-oriented material (which Dunhill was not willing to give them). Willie Fulton (lead vocals, guitar), Denny Ellis (guitar, backing vocals), and David Stensen (bass, backing vocals) went back to San Francisco, with drummer Joel Larson being the only one who remained in Los Angeles (he later returned to the group in 1971). Fulton, Ellis, and Stensen continued to appear as the Grass Roots, with original Bedouins drummer Bill Shoppe, until Dunhill ordered them to cease, because the label decided to start all over again with another group, whom they would groom to be the Grass Roots. In the meantime, the second version of "Where Were You When I Needed You" peaked in the Top 40 in mid-1966, while an album of the same name sold poorly.

Still looking for a group to record their material and promote it with live dates, Sloan and Barri in 1966 offered Wisconsin-based band The Robbs (for whom they produced some early material) a chance to assume the identity of the Grass Roots, but the group declined.

Peak years
The group's third – and by far most successful – incarnation was finally found in a Los Angeles band called The 13th Floor (not to be confused with the 13th Floor Elevators). This band consisted of Creed Bratton (vocals, guitar), Rick Coonce (drums, percussion), Warren Entner (vocals, guitar, keyboards), and Kenny Fukomoto (vocals, bass) and had formed only a year earlier. Entner, who had been attending film school at UCLA alongside future The Doors members Jim Morrison and Ray Manzarek, was drifting through Europe in the summer of 1965 singing and playing on street corners when he met fellow busker and American Creed Bratton in Israel, where an Israeli businessman expressed interest in managing and promoting them. The duo moved on individually, though, and ended up back in LA by 1966, where they formed the 13th Floor and submitted a demo tape to Dunhill Records. After Fukomoto was drafted into the army, the group went through two replacements before the label found and instated singer Rob Grill, who had a voice that P.F. Sloan regarded as the perfect vehicle to convey his songs in a more commercially accessible manner than Sloan could with his own singing. Grill only played guitar, but had to quickly learn the rudiments of bass to fill that vacancy in the lineup. In 1967, the band was offered the choice to go with their own name or choose to adopt a name that had already been heard of nationwide.

In the beginning, they were one of many U.S. guitar pop/rock bands, but with the help of Barri and their other producers, they developed a unique sound for which they drew as heavily on British beat as on soul music, rhythm and blues, and folk rock. Many of their recordings featured a brass section, which was a novelty in those days among American rock bands, with groups like Chicago just developing.

The bulk of the band's material continued to be written by Dunhill Records staff (not only Sloan and Barri), and the LA studio musicians who were part of what became known as the Wrecking Crew played the music on most, but not all, of their hits. The Grass Roots also recorded songs written by the group's musicians, which appeared on their albums and the B-sides of many hit singles.

As the Grass Roots, they had their first top-10 hit in the summer of 1967 with "Let's Live for Today", an English-language cover version of "Piangi con me", a 1966 hit for the Anglo-Italian quartet The Rokes. "Let's Live for Today" sold over one million copies and was awarded a gold disc. With Rob Grill as lead singer, they recorded a third version of "Where Were You When I Needed You". The band continued in a similar hit-making vein for the next five years (1967–1972).

The Grass Roots played at the Fantasy Fair and Magic Mountain Music Festival on Sunday, June 11, 1967, in the Summer of Love as "Let's Live for Today" was at number 15 and climbing.

In late 1967, the band recorded the album Feelings, which featured much heavier input in the songwriting and playing by the group members themselves, but its failure to sell prompted Barri to take full hold of the reins again, as he began to move the band in a more R&B, horn-punctuated direction. By this time, Sloan had phased out of his involvement with the band and relocated to New York City to pursue a solo career.
 
On Sunday, October 27, 1968, the Grass Roots played at the San Francisco Pop Festival as their hit "Midnight Confessions" (their first record to feature horns, and with Carol Kaye playing the opening bassline) was peaking at number five. They then played at the Los Angeles Pop Festival and Miami Pop Festival in December 1968.

Creed Bratton became frustrated by Dunhill's refusal to allow the band to write its own songs and play the instruments on its records (although the members did play alone at concerts). After a disastrous appearance at the Fillmore West in April 1969, a "slightly inebriated" Bratton was asked to leave the band. He was replaced by Dennis Provisor on keyboards and vocals, and lead guitarist Terry Furlong (1969–1971) was also brought in to form a quintet. This was the first of many line-up changes for this version of the band.

According to Rob Grill, the band turned down "Don't Pull Your Love" and "Love Grows (Where My Rosemary Goes)," the latter supposedly because one of the members had a girlfriend named Rosemary and they thought it was inappropriate to have a song with her name and not the other members' girlfriends. Both songs became regulars they performed live and later included on their 2000 live album The Grass Roots – Live At Last.

The Grass Roots, with their new members, played at Newport Pop Festival 1969 at Devonshire Downs, which was a racetrack at the time, but now is part of the North Campus for California State University, Northridge. The group played on Sunday June 22, 1969, a week before their hit "I'd Wait A Million Years" reached the Hot 100. In Canada, they played at the Vancouver Pop Festival at the Paradise Valley Resort in British Columbia in August 1969.

By 1971, Furlong had stopped touring with the group to pursue a solo career, but continued to contribute on records during the rest of the band's time on Dunhill. His touring replacement was Brian Naughton, who left in 1972. Drummer Rick Coonce was gone, as well, by the beginning of 1972, and new members Joe Pollard (drums, percussion) and another guitarist named Terry (last name unknown) joined up. Terry was soon replaced by Reed Kailing (vocals, guitars). Drummer Pollard and keyboardist Dennis Provisor left soon after to go out as a duo (although Provisor was featured on the band's 1972 Move Along album) and were replaced by a returning Rick Coonce and keyboard man Virgil Weber (ex-Hamilton, Joe Frank and Reynolds and Climax). Coonce was back for only a short period before he was gone again, turning the drum slot over to original member Joel Larson. Singers Rob Grill and Warren Entner remained the point of focus during these years.

The group's songs during 1967–1972 include: "Let's Live for Today", a cover of an Italian hit by The Rokes, "Piangi con me" (U.S. number eight) and "Things I Should Have Said" (U.S. number 23) (1967); "Midnight Confessions" (U.S. number five, their biggest hit) (1968); "Bella Linda" (a cover of an Italian hit by Lucio Battisti, "Balla Linda") (U.S. number 28), "Lovin' Things" (a cover of a UK hit by Marmalade the previous year) (U.S. number 49), "The River Is Wide" (U.S. number 31), "I'd Wait a Million Years" (U.S. number 15), and "Heaven Knows" (U.S. number 24) (1969); "Walking Through the Country" (U.S. number 44), and "Baby Hold On" (U.S. number 35) (1970); "Temptation Eyes" (number 15), "Sooner or Later" (U.S. number 9), and "Two Divided by Love" (U.S. number 16) (1971); "Glory Bound" (U.S. number 34) and "The Runway" (U.S. number 39) (1972).

By early 1974, the Grass Roots had left Dunhill (now ABC Records), and Kailing, Weber, and longtime member Entner (later a successful manager with groups such as Rage Against the Machine and Quiet Riot) moved on, while former members Terry Furlong and Dennis Provisor returned. Furlong left permanently by mid-1974 to be succeeded by Gene Barkin, then by Reggie Knighton. The resulting group was Grill, Larson, Provisor, and Knighton. Dennis Lambert and Brian Potter, who had penned the group's 1971 hit "Two Divided by Love" and many others, invited the band to join their Haven label, where they released an eponymous album in 1975, The Grass Roots, containing the single "Mamacita", which charted at number  71 on the Billboard Hot 100. Follow-up singles failed to chart.

Later years

1976 to 1981
Their 1976 single "Out In The Open" proved to be their swan song on Haven. Knighton left in 1976 and Alan Deane took over, followed by guitarist Glen Shulfer in 1977. ABC Records issued a final greatest-hits package of the group titled ABC Collection in 1976, but in late 1977, Grill decided to take a break from performing and later recorded the 14 Greats album on Gusto Records featuring Provisor and himself. This album consisted of 1978 rerecordings of their hits.

The group, still managed and booked by Grill (who owned the group's name), in late 1977 continued touring with Larson, Mark Miller (lead vocals, guitar), and Brian Carlyss (bass, backing vocals), joined by Lonnie Price (lead vocals, keyboards) and Randy Ruff (organ, backing vocals) for touring dates and TV appearances until November 1978. Larson was then joined by new players Scott Hoyt (lead vocals, guitars), David Nagy (lead vocals, bass), and Gene Wall (keyboards). Nagy and Larson left in 1979, and were replaced by a returning Carlyss and Reagan McKinley (drums, percussion).

During this period, the group appeared on an HBO television special,  '60s Rock Scrapbook, filmed at Magic Mountain amusement park in Valencia, California, in October 1979, with Grill and Dennis Provisor making special appearances.

Grill launched a solo career in 1979 (assisted on his solo album, Uprooted, by Lindsey Buckingham, Mick Fleetwood, and John McVie of Fleetwood Mac on the song "Rock Sugar"). Grill toured as a solo act in 1979–1980 opening for Fleetwood Mac's Tusk tour with a band led by guitarist Rick Alexander.

When interest in bands of the 1960s began to rise again in 1980, Grill (along with Provisor, Shulfer, and new players Steve Berendt (bass) and Luke Meurett (drums) took back the Grass Roots name and toured the United States and Japan. Guitarist Miller returned to substitute dome more dates with the group in 1981.

1982 to 1993
In 1982, Grill decided to go forward with a brand-new lineup consisting of seasoned session players. They were Terry Oubre (guitars, backing vocals), Charles Judge (keyboards, synthesizers, backing vocals), and Ralph Gilmore (drums, percussion, backing vocals). Another keyboardist, Bob Luna, came in around mid-1982 to subtitute for Judge on dates when he was not available. That same year, the new band released Powers of the Night on MCA. This was the last album of new material to be released by the Grass Roots to date.

Later in 1982, the Grass Roots performed an Independence Day concert on the National Mall in Washington, DC, attracting a large crowd and setting a record for attendance (over half a million people), at that time, for an outdoor concert for a single musical act. In April 1983, James G. Watt, President Ronald Reagan's Secretary of the Interior, banned Independence Day concerts on the mall by such groups. Watt said, "rock bands" that had performed on the Mall on Independence Day in 1981 and 1982 had encouraged drug use and alcoholism and had attracted "the wrong element", who would mug people and families attending any similar events in the future. During the ensuing uproar, Grill stated that he felt "highly insulted" by Watt's remarks, which he called "nothing but un-American".

After Powers of the Night failed to attract much attention, Grill and the group continued to tour into 1984. Dave Rodgers (keyboards, backing vocals) replaced Charles Judge and after Terry Oubre and Ralph Gilmore departed, Grill brought in two additional new players named George Spellman (guitars, backing vocals) and Coy Fuller (drums, percussion) and headed over to tour Europe in the summer of '84. According to Grill,  a country single, "St. Somewhere", also was recorded in Nashville with this same lineup. The single had a very limited release, with the same song on the flip, as Oak 1071, credited to Rob Grill and the Grass Roots.  "St. Somewhere" was written by Kent Robbins and the track was produced by Mark Sherrill.

By late 1984, Grill had returned to the US and was touring with yet another new group of Grass Roots that included Dusty Hanvey (guitars, backing vocals), Larry Nelson (keyboards, synthesizers, backing vocals), and David Page (drums, percussion). This lineup's first show was in Okinawa.

From this point on, Grill and the group would concentrate on the "60s nostalgia" circuit, starting with the Happy Together '85 Tour with fellow 1960s groups The Turtles, The Buckinghams, and Gary Lewis & the Playboys.

In 1986, another package had them appearing with The Monkees, Gary Puckett, and Herman's Hermits. They were joined in this show by bassist Mark Clarke (ex-Uriah Heep and Rainbow) and a horn section, and backed up The Monkees and Gary Puckett during their sets, as well.

Hanvey and Nelson continued backing The Monkees for their 1987 tour, while the Grass Roots joined Classic Superfest, which also featured Herman's Hermits, Mark Lindsay, and Gene Clark's Byrds. For this tour, Mark Tomorsky handled guitar and Michael Lewis (soon replaced by Robbie Barker) was on keyboards. Terry Danauer was also added on bass then, but by October 1987, Hanvey and Nelson were back with Grill, and Joe Dougherty replaced David Page on drums in 1989.

In 1991, Rhino Records released a double CD anthology of the group.

Mike Stec came in for Danauer on bass in 1992–1993 before Grill took over bass again. From here on the band's lineup was stable.

1994 to 2011
On January 16, 1999, former Grass Roots members Joel Larson, Virgil Weber, and Creed Bratton, along with Paul Downing on vocals and lead guitar (of Herman's Hermits and The Standells), Justin Chats on vocals, keyboards, and saxophone, Dan Schwartz on bass, and David Olson on backing vocals, were part of a 35th Anniversary Celebration at the Whisky a Go Go in Los Angeles. They shared the stage with Johnny Rivers, Nancy Sinatra, the Robby Krieger Band, and Drake Levin and Phil Volk of Paul Revere and the Raiders.

In 2000, Grill released a Grass Roots live concert album titled Live at Last, which was followed in 2001 by an album with a symphonic quartet titled Symphonic Hits.

During the 2000s, the group regulars had available substitutes (former Outsiders singer Sonny Geraci sat in for Grill during the first half of 2002, Scott Sechman filled in for Hanvey in 1998, Chris Merrell filled in for Hanvey on various dates 2000–2006, while Hal Ratliff came in for Nelson when he had other commitments from 2000 on.

In 2008, Grill released a second live concert album titled Live Gold and brought in Mark Dawson (vocals, bass) earlier that same year to fill in when he was absent.

During the summers of 2010 and 2011, the Grass Roots had heavy touring schedules throughout the U.S., both on their own and as part of the Happy Together: 25th Anniversary Tour, along with Flo & Eddie of The Turtles, Mark Lindsay, The Buckinghams, and The Monkees member Micky Dolenz. Grill continued to lead the band into the current millennium as the Grass Roots sole owner, and made appearances with the band until his death.

Rick Coonce died of heart failure on February 25, 2011, and Rob Grill died on July 11, 2011, from complications following a stroke.

2012 to present
In 2012, the group was again part of the Happy Together Tour and the current band of Dawson, Dougherty, Hanvey, and Nelson continued to tour nationwide, oftentimes appearing with other classic rock groups such as John Kay and Steppenwolf, Tommy James and The Shondells, The Buckinghams, and Herman's Hermits starring Peter Noone.

Creed Bratton referred to his time with the Grass Roots in an episode of The Office ("Booze Cruise" in season two) in the deleted scenes on DVD.

Again in 2015, they joined The Turtles, The Association, Mark Lindsay, The Buckinghams, and The Cowsills for that year's  Happy Together Tour.

In December 2015, the American Pop Music Hall of Fame released their 2016 inductees: Barbra Streisand, The Grass Roots, Barry Manilow, Neil Sedaka, The Association, Dion, The Lettermen, Paul Revere and the Raiders, The Temptations, and Three Dog Night.

In 2016, the Grass Roots were part of the Flower Power Cruise joining Peter Asher, Blood, Sweat & Tears, Felix Cavaliere, Micky Dolenz, The Guess Who, Peter Noone, Jefferson Starship, Mark Lindsay, Gary Puckett & the Union Gap, The Turtles, and Christian Nesmith.

Band members

Current 
 Mark Dawson — lead vocals, bass guitar (2008–present)
 Dusty Hanvey — lead guitar, backing vocals (1984–present)
 Larry Nelson — keyboards, synthesizers, backing vocals (1984–present)
 Joe Dougherty — drums, percussion (1989–present)

Former members 
Original
Steve Barri – backing vocals, various instruments, songwriter, producer (1965–73)
P. F. Sloan – lead vocals, guitar, songwriter, producer (1965–67; died 2015)
Joel Larson – drums (1965–66, 1972–79, 1981)
The Bedouins
Denny Ellis – rhythm guitar, backing vocals (1965–66)
Willie Fulton – lead vocals, lead guitar (1965–66)
David Stensen – bass, backing vocals (1965–66)
Bill Shoppe - drums (1966)
13th Floor
Rob Grill – vocals, bass, songwriter (1967–77, 1980–2011; died 2011)
Warren Entner – vocals, rhythm guitar, keyboards, songwriter (1967–74)
Rick Coonce – drums, percussion, songwriter (1967–71, 1972; died 2011)
Creed Bratton – lead guitar, vocals, songwriter (1967–69)
Other 60's addition
Dennis Provisor – vocals, keyboards, songwriter (1969–72, 1974–77, 1980–82)
70's additions
Terry Furlong – lead guitar (1969–71, 1974)
Brian Naughton – lead guitar (1971–72)
Virgil Weber – keyboards (1972–74)
Reed Kailing – lead guitar, vocals, songwriter (1972–74)
Joe Pollard – drums, percussion (1972)
Terry – lead guitar (1972)
Gene Barkin – guitar (1974)
Reggie Knighton – lead guitar, backing vocals (1974–76)
Alan Deane – lead guitar, backing vocals (1976–77)
Glen Shulfer – guitar, backing vocals (1977, 1980–82)
Brian Carlyss – bass, backing vocals (1977–78, 1979–80; died 2007)
Mark Miller – lead guitar, lead vocals (1977–78, 1981)
Lonnie Price – keyboards, lead vocals (1977–78)
Randy Ruff – organ, backing vocals (1977–78)
Scott Hoyt – lead vocals, lead guitar (1978–80)
Gene Wall – keyboards, backing vocals (1978–80)
Dave Nagy – bass, lead vocals (1978–79)
Reagan McKinley – drums, percussion (1979–80)
80's additions
Steve Berendt – bass (1980–82)
Luke Meurett – drums, percussion (1980–82)
Terry Oubre – lead guitar, backing vocals (1982–84)
Ralph Gilmore – drums, percussion, backing vocals (1982–84)
Charles Judge – keyboards, synthesizers, backing vocals (1982–84)
Bob Luna – keyboards, backing vocals (fill in-1982)
Coy Fuller – drums, percussion (1984)
George Spellman – guitar, backing vocals (1984)
Dave Rodgers – keyboards, backing vocals (1984)
David Page – drums, percussion (1984–90)
Terry Danauer – bass (1987–92)
Cary Lenard - keyboards, backing vocals (1989)
Richard Fanning – trumpet (on occasion, 1987–88)
Kevin Osborne – trombone (on occasion, 1987–88)
Robbie Barker – keyboards (1987)
Michael Lewis – keyboards (1987)
Mark Tomorsky – guitar, backing vocals (1987)
90's addition
Michael Stec– bass, backing vocals (1992–93)
Scott Sechman – guitar, backing vocals (fill in-1998)
00's fills
Chris Merrell – (died from cancer) lead guitar, backing vocals (fill in—2000–03, 2006)
Hal Ratliff – keyboards, backing vocals (fill in 2000–present)
Sonny Geraci – lead vocals (fill in for Grill-2002; died 2017)

Timeline

Discography

Singles

+ Gold Record – RIAA Certification

Albums

+ Gold Record – RIAA Certification

Pop culture

 The name Grass Roots was used sporadically by Arthur Lee of Love, in the Los Angeles area. Dunhill Records secured the legal use of the name by releasing a record, which Lee never did.
 The song "Let's Live for Today" has the identical Italian melody and virtually the same arrangement that was used in an earlier song called "Be Mine Again"; although this song includes the "One, Two, Three, Four" and "Sha-La-La-La-La" as in the Grass Roots hit, the lyrics are otherwise different. The version by Dutch band The Skope that was released in 1966 is included on the Pebbles, Volume 15 LP.
 The band was seen in the Doris Day film With Six You Get Eggroll. They play the song "Feelings" at a crowded dance party.
 The Grass Roots have appeared on over 50 national television shows including, The Tonight Show, The Today Show, Ed Sullivan, Andy Williams, Sonny & Cher, Good Morning America, VH1 Hit-Makers, MTV, and a record 16 times on Dick Clark's American Bandstand.
 The 1975 The Grass Roots LP is seen in the film FM. The back cover appears in a long DJ broadcast room scene with characters played by Cleavon Little and Martin Mull.
 The band is mentioned by John Candy's character in the film Uncle Buck. He comments about the music while navigating a teenage party looking for his missing niece.
 Guitarist Creed Bratton played a character also named Creed Bratton, a fictional version of himself, in the US version of the television show The Office. In a scene that never aired from the episode "Booze Cruise", Bratton's boss, Michael, borrowed the guitar from a cruise ship's band and poorly plays a version of "Smoke on the Water" by Deep Purple. Bratton then takes the guitar from Michael and proceeds to surprise the rest of the passengers with his excellent playing. The scene then cuts to a confessional, where Bratton talks of his time with the Grass Roots, complete with pictures of the actual band and references to actual tours. In another deleted scene from the episode "Product Recall", a fictional Scranton Times writer notices Bratton was a member of the Grass Roots. He also sang one of his own songs titled "Spinnin' N Reelin'" in the episode "A Benihana Christmas". In the series finale, it is revealed in the actual episode that Creed was a member of the Grass Roots. Creed performs his own song "All the Faces" to close out the episode.
 The band was mentioned frequently on the nationally syndicated Don and Mike radio show. Don Geronimo sat in with the band several times at performances in the Washington, D.C. area.
 The Grass Roots version of the Bob Dylan song "Ballad of a Thin Man" was featured in the 1987 Robin Williams film Good Morning, Vietnam.
 The Grass Roots song "Midnight Confessions" was featured in the 1997 film Jackie Brown.
 In 2006 former manager Marty Angelo published a book entitled Once Life Matters: A New Beginning, which has numerous stories about his life on the road with Rob Grill and the Grass Roots in the early 1970s.

See also

References

External links 
 

1966 establishments in California
ABC Records artists
American pop rock music groups
Dunhill Records artists
MCA Records artists
Musical groups established in 1966
Musical groups from Los Angeles
Psychedelic pop music groups
Psychedelic rock music groups from California
Sunshine pop